Mirza Majid Movaghar (1898–1968)  was a Persian politician. He represented Dezful, Khuzestan in the 11th, 12th, 13th, and 16th National Consultative Assembly.

References 

1898 births
1968 deaths
20th-century Iranian politicians